Theta Pictoris (θ Pic) is a star in the Pictor constellation.

Theta Pictoris is a multiple star system: AB: 7.0, 7.5; PA 152°, separation 0.2" C: 7.0; PA 287°, separation 38".

The Theta Pictoris system consists of a total of 4 stars. Theta Pictoris C (HD 35859), an A2V star of about 6.77 magnitude, can be distinguished visually with a small telescope from the main system Theta Pictoris AB; its angular separation from AB is 38.3 arc seconds. Theta Pictoris AB, in turn, consists of a magnitude 6.76 A0V star and a magnitude 7.40 star separated by 0.287" with an orbital period of 123.2 years and eccentricity of 0.692. One of them is also an unresolved spectroscopic binary.

Tet Pic B or HD 35859, Hip 25298, SAO 233964

References 

Pictor (constellation)
Pictoris, Theta
Triple star systems
A-type main-sequence stars
025303
035860
1818
Durchmusterung objects